John Delphus McDuffie Jr.  (December 5, 1938 – August 11, 1991) was an American racing driver. He competed in the NASCAR Winston Cup Series from 1963 to 1991, collecting 106 top-10 finishes during his career, despite never finishing on the lead lap of any race in his career, and holding the record for the most starts in NASCAR's top level without a win with 653. He died in a racing accident during the Budweiser at The Glen at Watkins Glen International in 1991.

Career

After attending his first race in Bowman Gray Stadium at the age of ten, McDuffie was inspired by racers Curtis Turner, Glen Wood, Billy Myers, and others to become a race car driver.

His racing career started in dirt track racing. He picked the No. 70 early on because it was easy to paint and easy to remember.

McDuffie won several small races throughout the Carolinas including a track championship at a small dirt track near Rockingham, North Carolina. McDuffie made his NASCAR Grand National (now NASCAR Cup Series) debut in 1963 at the Racing Association of Myrtle Beach, Inc. Speedway near Myrtle Beach, South Carolina driving Curtis Turner’s old 1961 Ford. Though McDuffie was an expert dirt track racer, he never had similar success in NASCAR's premiership. His best NASCAR finish came at the Albany-Saratoga Speedway, in 1971, where he managed to finish third. Meanwhile, his first last-place finish came at the 1963 Pickens 200. In 1978, McDuffie won the pole position for the Delaware 500, his only pole position in Winston Cup competition. Normally a low-budget independent, McDuffie entered into a partnership with Donald Magnum and purchased a chassis from Richard Childress Racing.  McDuffie in 1982 also made a start in the final race of the season at Riverside in Junior Johnson's second car, which was entered to protect Darrell Waltrip, who was on his way to winning that season's championship; If Waltrip had an accident in practice or qualifying, McDuffie could relinquish the second car to him and Waltrip would not jeopardize his championship hopes by missing the race.

In the 1988 Daytona 500 qualifying race, McDuffie received second- and third-degree burns in an accident after he raced without fireproof gloves (a practice no longer permitted in NASCAR) because they were stolen before the race.

One day before his fatal accident at Watkins Glen International, McDuffie won a celebrity race in Owego, New York, at the Shangri-La Speedway, not far from Watkins Glen.

McDuffie is still the record holder for the most starts in NASCAR's top touring series without recording a win. His 653 starts rank him 22nd all-time through the end of 2018. McDuffie held the series record for the most last-place finishes with 32 until Joe Nemechek surpassed him in 2014.

In 2016, Front Row Motorsports and Landon Cassill honored McDuffie with a tribute paint scheme during the throwback weekend at Darlington Raceway complete with sponsors that sponsored McDuffie's racing effort.

Death
McDuffie was involved in an accident on the fifth lap of the 1991 Budweiser at The Glen race at Watkins Glen International. On the straight between the esses (Turns 2-3-4) and the Loop-Chute (Turn 5), at 170 mph, McDuffie collided with Jimmy Means after suffering a mechanical failure. McDuffie's left front wheel spindle broke off the car, causing him to lose brakes and hit Means in the right front. This left him no way of stopping the car or steering it, and to further complicate matters, there was no gravel trap in the corner that McDuffie was headed toward. As a result, McDuffie skidded across the grass and hit the Armco outside retaining wall and tire barrier with such force that the car shot into the air, rotated, and then came to rest upside-down. Means also crashed into the same corner but was able to slow his vehicle down before the impact; his car went to the side of McDuffie's as it was in mid-air. Means, a fellow independent racer, suffered only minor cuts and bruises in the accident, and got out of his car to check on McDuffie. After peering into McDuffie's car, Means began frantically signaling for assistance, later saying, "It was so bad that I just had to close my eyes." A host of medical personnel and track workers rushed to the scene. The race was delayed for one hour and forty-eight minutes as McDuffie was removed from his car and his Pontiac was removed from the infield. Also, the wall that McDuffie and Means struck had to be repaired. As the cars got back on the track and cruised under yellow flag conditions, the media attention turned to Chip Williams, NASCAR's PR director, who disclosed that McDuffie had died instantly from head and brain injuries. The direct cause of death was a basilar skull fracture caused by rapid head movement to the right. Williams, in the live interview where McDuffie's death was confirmed, and NASCAR, 
erroneously reported that McDuffie was 53; he would not have been 53 until December 5 of that year.

McDuffie's death led to changes at Watkins Glen and also influenced motorsport safety changes that would come to full fruition at the end of the decade. Six weeks earlier, Camel GT prototype driver Tommy Kendall had a hard crash in the same section during the Camel Continental VIII, when a wheel failed on his Pratt & Miller Intrepid RM-1-Chevrolet prototype, sliding into the barrier, breaking both his legs and sidelining him for the rest of the 1991 season, including the Winston Cup race, where he was set to substitute for Kyle Petty, injured at Talladega in May (Kendall had substituted for Petty at Sears Point earlier in the year). The track was then given a bus stop chicane placed slightly before the entrance of turn five, the section of track in question, and a gravel trap (since paved over after research into motorsport safety proved the advantage of a tarmac runoff), for the 1992 season.

Also, at the time, basilar skull fractures were the subject of developing research by Jim Downing and Bob Hubbard into a head and neck restraint for motorsport. Downing, a champion sports car racer, and his brother-in-law Hubbard, were in the process of developing the HANS device, which had just begun production. McDuffie's death was among the catalysts that led to increased funding by the automakers to continue research into basilar skull fractures as part of motorsport safety improvements, as adoption by sports car drivers of HANS had increased. By the end of the decade, following two CART fatalities in one season and three NASCAR fatalities in a span of five months, and then the start of the next decade with two more fatalities (including that of Dale Earnhardt, Sr.), and research into the head and neck restraints that had quickly been adopted, most motorsport sanctioning bodies mandated head and neck restraints worldwide.

McDuffie's widow, Ima Jean, unsuccessfully sued Watkins Glen for $4.25 million, claiming the barrier McDuffie hit was unsafe. The judge in that case ruled that McDuffie was familiar enough with the track to be aware of the dangers and that mechanical failure caused the accident. The cause of the mechanical failure was never explained as NASCAR did a very brief investigation and the wheel that broke off disappeared before it could be returned to the McDuffie family. From McDuffie's death in 1991 to 2001, notable stock car drivers such as Dale Earnhardt, Adam Petty, Blaise Alexander, and Kenny Irwin Jr. would also die from crashes that caused basilar skull fractures. Research into head and neck restraints would lead to the development of devices such as the HANS device and the Hutchens device. In modern times most motorsport sanctioning bodies worldwide (including NASCAR), mandate drivers to use head and neck restraints. However it wasn't until October 2001, more than 10 years after McDuffie's death, that NASCAR mandated that all drivers wear head and neck restraints in the form of a HANS device or a Hutchens device. In January 2005 NASCAR banned the use of the Hutchens device and forced all drivers to use the HANS device instead.

McDuffie is buried at Buffalo Cemetery, Sanford, North Carolina.

Personal life
McDuffie made Sanford, North Carolina home; the city supported him through struggles much like it did with hometown driver Herb Thomas. McDuffie married Ima Jean Wood in 1959 and together they had two children, Jeff and Linda; all of whom survive him.

On August 8, 2021, nearly 30 years after his death, Ima Jean died at age 83.

Motorsports career results

NASCAR
(key) (Bold – Pole position awarded by qualifying time. Italics – Pole position earned by points standings or practice time. * – Most laps led.)

Grand National Series

Winston Cup Series

Daytona 500

Busch Series

ARCA Permatex SuperCar Series
(key) (Bold – Pole position awarded by qualifying time. Italics – Pole position earned by points standings or practice time. * – Most laps led.)

References

External links
The Legend of J.D. McDuffie: J.D.'s strong performances
The Legend of J.D. McDuffie: The 1991 season
Salute to J.D.

.
-Tribute by PattyKay Lilley - Writer for racefansforever.com

1938 births
1991 deaths
NASCAR drivers
Racing drivers who died while racing
Sports deaths in New York (state)
Accidental deaths in New York (state)
People from Harnett County, North Carolina
Filmed deaths in motorsport
Racing drivers from North Carolina
Burials in North Carolina